The Agrij is a left tributary of the river Someș in Romania. It flows through the communes Buciumi, Agrij, Românași, Creaca and Jibou. It discharges into the Someș in Jibou.

References

Rivers of Romania
Rivers of Sălaj County